The Rega is a river in north-western Poland, flowing into the Baltic Sea.

Rega may also refer to:

Places 

 Kallepalli Rega, a village in Lakkavarapukota mandal in Vizianagaram district, India
 Pusapati Rega, a village in Vizianagaram district of the Indian state of Andhra Pradesh, India
 Rega, Buner, an administrative unit in the Khyber Pakhtunkhwa province of Pakistan
 Treptow an der Rega, a town in the West Pomeranian Voivodeship, Poland

Organizations 

 Rega (air rescue) in Switzerland
 Rega Institute for Medical Research in Belgium
 Rega Research British manufacturer of hi-fi equipment
Rega Planar 3, a record player manufactured by Rega Research

People with the surname 

 Amedeo Rega (1920–2007), Italian football player
 Chantal Réga (born 1955), French sprinter and hurdler
 Horacio Rega Molina (1899-1957) Argentine poet specializing in sonnets, journalist, and dramatist
 José López Rega (1916–1989), Argentine politician
 Mario Cerciello Rega (19842019), Italian police officer murdered by two American teenagers in 2019

Other uses 

 Rega im Dodley (Hebrew: רגע עם דודלי; lit.t. "A Moment with Dodley"), an original Israeli TV show for children
 Rega Lifney She... (Hebrew: ...רגע לפני ש, meaning "Just before…"), the second studio album by Israeli singer Shiri Maimon
 Rega Institute for Medical Research, a scientific establishment belonging to the Catholic University of Leuven in Belgium
 Rega Research, a British audio equipment manufacturer
 Rega (air rescue), a private, non-profit air rescue service of emergency medical assistance in Switzerland and Liechtenstein

See also 

 Regas
 Riga (disambiguation)